Nazia Akhter Juthi is a Bangladeshi badminton player.

Career 
Nazia Akhter Juthi won her first two national titles in Bangladesh in 1986, and she was successful in both the women's single and mixed. Six further titles won until 1996. She was once successful in the women's single, three times in the double and four times in the mixed.

She was awarded National Sports Awards in 2012.

References 

Year of birth missing (living people)
Living people
Bangladeshi female badminton players
Recipients of the Bangladesh National Sports Award